Harawî (also Herui) was a designated nomos in the area around Coptos in Upper Egypt. Harawî was once politically important, but during the 11th Dynasty, it was overshadowed by Thebes in the nomos of Waset. Another important town in the nomos was Ombos, the main cult place of the deity Seth. A third important place was Iushenshen, that became at the very end of the Old Kingdom capital of the nome, at least for a certain period. 

The Harawî nomos was at the starting point of the two great routes leading to the coast of the Red Sea, the one towards the port Tââou (Myos Hormos), the other more southerly, towards the port of Shashirît (Berenice Troglodytica).

The nome is first mentioned in the tomb of the king's son Netjeraperef at Dahshur, who dates under Snofru.

The reading of the nomes name is disputed in Egyptology and is written with two falcons. The hieroglyph of a falcon can be read in different ways, either as Her, or Horus. In this case Herui means the two Horuses. Other readings for a falcon are netjer (god): netjerui (the two gods) or bik (falcon): bikui (the two falcons).

References

 Catholic Encyclopedia of 1913 (public domain): "Coptos"

Nomes of ancient Egypt